Harambee Youth Employment Accelerator is a South African nonprofit founded to address the youth unemployment crisis by connecting employers to first-time job seekers.

About
Harambee seeks to address the South African youth unemployment crisis by helping companies hire young, first-time job seekers. The organization has developed a mobile-based network that collects job-seekers' details, assesses candidates, offers training, and matches them to employers looking for their skillsets. By signing up for and showing up regularly to classes and training, candidates can demonstrate reliability, and thus employability. The goal is to encourage companies to take a chance on workers with no experience, often from poor households. As of May 2019, Harambee has a network of 500,000 young job seekers and 500 company partners.

According to RTI International, Harambee was involved in the development of a curriculum for digital literacy and professional networking skills hosted on the gcyerti.com website.

Recognition

Harambee has been the recipient of a number of grants and awards, including the Skoll Award for Social Entrepreneurship, a finalist for the 2019 Conscious Companies award and the Global Center for Youth Employment award. It was one of the  Aspen Institute's 2015 John P. McNulty prize laureates and also received recognition from USAID and a $3.5 million grant in 2020. In 2019, they were voted the 8th most popular brand in South Africa in the "Coolest Campaign Targeted at Youth 2019" category.

History

Harambee was founded in 2011 by Nicola Galombik, who is also the Executive Director at Yellowwoods, a global investment group based in South Africa. The name "Harambee" is Swahili for "we all pull together". The organization was incubated by Yellowwoods in partnership with the South African Government's National Treasury's Jobs Fund. Maryana Iskander took over as Chief Executive Officer in 2012. According to Iskander, their initial goal was to "scale and place 10,000 people into their first jobs". In 2015, Harambee made an on-stage commitment at the Clinton Global Initiative to provide unemployed youth in South Africa access to 50,000 jobs and work experiences. As of June 2019, Harambee had connected 100,000 young South Africans to employment.

References

External links
 Harambee Youth Employment Accelerator

Social enterprises
Non-profit organisations based in South Africa